This is a glossary of some terms used in Riemannian geometry and metric geometry — it doesn't cover the terminology of differential topology.

The following articles may also be useful; they either contain specialised vocabulary or provide more detailed expositions of the definitions given below.

 Connection
 Curvature
 Metric space
 Riemannian manifold
See also:
 Glossary of general topology
 Glossary of differential geometry and topology
 List of differential geometry topics

Unless stated otherwise, letters X, Y, Z below denote metric spaces, M, N denote Riemannian manifolds, |xy| or  denotes the distance between points x and y in X. Italic word denotes a self-reference to this glossary.

A caveat: many terms in Riemannian and metric geometry, such as convex function, convex set and others, do not have exactly the same meaning as in general mathematical usage.



A 

Alexandrov space a generalization of Riemannian manifolds with upper, lower or integral curvature bounds (the last one works only in dimension 2)

Almost flat manifold

Arc-wise isometry the same as path isometry.

Autoparallel the same as totally geodesic

B 

Barycenter, see center of mass.

bi-Lipschitz map. A map  is called bi-Lipschitz if there are positive constants c and C such that for any x and y in X

Busemann function given a ray, γ : [0, ∞)→X, the Busemann function is defined by

C 

Cartan–Hadamard theorem is the statement that a connected, simply connected complete Riemannian manifold with non-positive sectional curvature is diffeomorphic to Rn via the exponential map; for metric spaces, the statement that a connected, simply connected complete geodesic metric space with non-positive curvature in the sense of Alexandrov is a (globally) CAT(0) space.

Cartan extended Einstein's General relativity to Einstein–Cartan theory, using Riemannian-Cartan geometry instead of Riemannian geometry. This extension provides affine torsion, which allows for non-symmetric curvature tensors and the incorporation of spin–orbit coupling.

Center of mass. A point q ∈ M is called the center of mass of the points  if it is a point of global minimum of the function

Such a point is unique if all distances  are less than radius of convexity.

Christoffel symbol

Collapsing manifold

Complete space

Completion

Conformal map is a map which preserves angles.

Conformally flat a manifold M is conformally flat if it is locally conformally equivalent to a Euclidean space, for example standard sphere is conformally flat.

Convex function. A function f on a Riemannian manifold is a convex if for any geodesic  the function  is convex. A function f is called -convex if for any geodesic  with natural parameter , the function  is convex.

Convex A subset K of a Riemannian manifold M is called convex if for any two points in K there is a shortest path connecting them which lies entirely in K, see also totally convex.

Cotangent bundle

Covariant derivative

Cut locus

D 

Diameter of a metric space is the supremum of distances between pairs of points.

Developable surface is a surface isometric to the plane.

Dilation of a map between metric spaces is the infimum of numbers L such that the given map is L-Lipschitz.

E 

Exponential map: Exponential map (Lie theory), Exponential map (Riemannian geometry)

F 

Finsler metric

First fundamental form for an embedding or immersion is the pullback of the metric tensor.

G 

Geodesic is a curve which locally minimizes distance.

Geodesic flow is a flow on a tangent bundle TM of a manifold M, generated by a vector field whose trajectories are of the form  where  is a geodesic.

Gromov-Hausdorff convergence

Geodesic metric space is a metric space where any two points are the endpoints of a minimizing geodesic.

H 

Hadamard space is a complete simply connected space with nonpositive curvature.

Horosphere a level set of Busemann function.

I 

Injectivity radius The injectivity radius at a point p of a Riemannian manifold is the largest radius for which the exponential map at p is a diffeomorphism. The injectivity radius of a Riemannian manifold is the infimum of the injectivity radii at all points. See also cut locus.

For complete manifolds, if the injectivity radius at p is a finite number r, then either there is a geodesic of length 2r which starts and ends at p or  there is a point q conjugate to  p (see conjugate point above) and on the distance r from p. For a closed Riemannian manifold the injectivity radius is either half the minimal length of a closed geodesic or the minimal distance between conjugate points on a geodesic.

An infranilmanifold is finitely covered by a  nilmanifold.

Isometry is a map which preserves distances.

Intrinsic metric

J 

 Jordan curve

K 

Killing vector field

L 

Length metric the same as intrinsic metric.

Levi-Civita connection is a natural way to differentiate vector fields on Riemannian manifolds.

Lipschitz convergence the convergence defined by Lipschitz metric.

Lipschitz distance between metric spaces is the infimum of numbers r such that there is a bijective bi-Lipschitz map between these spaces with constants exp(-r), exp(r).

Lipschitz map

Logarithmic map is a right inverse of Exponential map.

M 

Mean curvature

Metric ball

Metric tensor

Minimal surface is a submanifold with (vector of) mean curvature zero.

N 

Natural parametrization is the parametrization by length.

Net. A subset S of a metric space X is called -net if for any point in X there is a point in S on the distance .  This is distinct from topological nets which generalize limits.

Nilmanifold: An element of the minimal set of manifolds which includes a point, and has the following property: any oriented -bundle over a nilmanifold is a nilmanifold. It also can be defined as a factor of a  connected nilpotent Lie group by a lattice.

Normal bundle: associated to an imbedding of a manifold M into an ambient Euclidean space , the normal bundle is a vector bundle whose fiber at each point p is the orthogonal complement (in ) of the tangent space .

Nonexpanding map same as short map

P 

Parallel transport

Polyhedral space a simplicial complex with a metric such that each simplex with induced metric is isometric to a simplex in Euclidean space.

Principal curvature is the maximum and minimum normal curvatures at a point on a surface.

Principal direction is the direction of the principal curvatures.

Path isometry

Proper metric space is a metric space in which every closed ball is compact. Equivalently, if every closed bounded subset is compact. Every proper metric space is complete.

Q 

Quasigeodesic has two meanings; here we give the most common. A map  (where  is a subsegment) is called a quasigeodesic if there are constants  and  such that for every 
 
Note that a quasigeodesic is not necessarily a continuous curve.

Quasi-isometry. A map  is called a quasi-isometry if there   are constants  and  such that 
 
and every point in Y has distance at most C from some point of f(X).
Note that a quasi-isometry is not assumed to be continuous. For example, any map between compact metric spaces is a quasi isometry. If there exists a quasi-isometry from X to Y, then X and Y are said to be quasi-isometric.

R 

Radius of metric space is the infimum of radii of metric balls which contain the space completely.

Radius of convexity at a point p of a Riemannian manifold is the largest radius of a ball which is a convex subset.

Ray is a one side infinite geodesic which is minimizing on each interval

Riemann curvature tensor

Riemannian manifold

Riemannian submersion is a map between Riemannian manifolds which is submersion and submetry at the same time.

S 

Second fundamental form is a quadratic form on the tangent space of hypersurface, usually denoted by II, an equivalent way to describe the shape operator of a hypersurface, 

It can be also generalized to arbitrary codimension, in which case it is a quadratic form with values in the normal space.

Shape operator for a hypersurface M is a linear operator on tangent spaces, Sp: TpM→TpM. If n is a unit normal field to M and v is a tangent vector then 
 
(there is no standard agreement whether to use + or − in the definition).

Short map is a distance non increasing map.

Smooth manifold

Sol manifold is a factor of a connected solvable Lie group by a lattice.

Submetry a short map f between metric spaces is called a submetry if there exists R > 0 such that for any point x and radius r < R we have that image of metric r-ball is an r-ball, i.e.

Sub-Riemannian manifold

Systole.  The k-systole of M, is the minimal volume of k-cycle nonhomologous to zero.

T 

Tangent bundle

Totally convex. A subset K of a Riemannian manifold M is called totally convex if for any two points in K any geodesic connecting them  lies entirely in K, see also convex.

Totally geodesic submanifold is a submanifold such that all geodesics in the submanifold are also geodesics of the surrounding manifold.

U 

Uniquely geodesic metric space is a metric space where any two points are the endpoints of a unique minimizing geodesic.

W 

Word metric on a group is a metric of the Cayley graph constructed using a set of generators.

Differential geometry
Geometry

Wikipedia glossaries using unordered lists